Bree (short for Breehy-hinny-brinny-hoohy-hah) is a fictional character in C. S. Lewis's The Chronicles of Narnia. He is one of the title characters and is featured prominently in The Horse and His Boy. This was the book published fifth, but the book's events are chronologically third.

Bree was born as a free talking beast in the Land of Narnia, but was captured as a colt by the Calormenes, and has lived his life as a warhorse in Calormen, owned by humans, and hiding his true nature as a talking horse.  Living as the only talking beast among "dumb and witless" horses, Bree has come to be both proud and vain. In The Horse and His Boy, Bree and the boy Shasta become companions on a journey to escape from Calormen and find freedom in the northern countries of Archenland and Narnia.  On their journey, they are joined by a talking mare, Hwin, and a Calormene Tarkheena (princess), Aravis.  In the course of their adventures, they thwart an attempted invasion of Archenland and Narnia, and Bree learns to face up to and surrender his pride and vanity to truly enter into a free life in Narnia.

Biographical summary 
Bree, an adventurous and inquisitive colt, was born in Narnia. He disregarded the warnings of his mother and ventured south past Archenland and into Calormen, where he was captured and either enslaved by or eventually sold to the Tarkaan Anradin. He spent many years pretending to be a dumb and witless horse to hide his origins and became one of the Tarkaan's prized possessions.  Bree developed a very high opinion of himself with only non-talking horses to compare himself to, further enhanced by his status as the prized steed of a Calormene lord and his training as a war charger.  Furthermore, having spent less time in Narnia than most talking horses, he had certain incorrect notions of Narnian behavior and culture.  In particular, he asserts that Aslan, Narnia's creator and patron, is not an actual lion, and is only referred to as an analogy of the fierceness and power of a lion; part of his reason for believing this is that he secretly fears lions.

Bree is forced to face this fear later in the book when the four protagonists are chased by a lion as they approach the dwelling of the Hermit of the Southern Waste. Bree flees in terror, outpacing Hwin and forcing Shasta to dismount Bree at full gallop to go back and help their companions.  This incident deflates much of Bree's ego, as he feels intense shame for leaving the two females behind while a boy raised as a peasant found the courage to go back.  The last of Bree's preconceived notions are then shattered when Aslan himself visits the hermitage; while Hwin submits meekly to the great lion, Bree retreats and cowers until ordered forward.  Aslan reveals that he was not only the lion who brought the group together but also the lion who chased them across the desert, the latter act was done to force the horses, Bree in particular, to the speed necessary for warning of the Calormene attack to reach Archenland and Narnia in time.  Aslan admonishes Bree for his hubris but says that Bree can change his ways as long as he realizes that he will be "nothing special" once he returns to Narnia, where he will be only one talking animal among many.

At the books close, the author notes that Bree and Hwin live happy lives in Narnia, both eventually marrying (though not to each other).  They are said to make frequent trips to Archenland to visit Cor and Aravis, who do end up married to each other and later become the rulers of Archenland.

In other works
Bree's shortened name is the same as the town in C. S. Lewis's lifetime friend J. R. R. Tolkien's book The Fellowship of the Ring, where there is an inn called The Prancing Pony.

In Hal Clement's 1953 science fiction novel Mission of Gravity, Bree is the name of the ship captained by the Mesklinite trader Brennan, one of the focal characters of the novel.

In the MMORPG RuneScape, Bree is known as a centaur general defending a commander of one of the RuneScape gods.

See also
 List of fictional horses

References

See also

The Chronicles of Narnia characters
Literary characters introduced in 1954
Fictional horses
Talking animals in fiction